Frank Arthur Triplett (10 May 1885 – 25 February 1967) was an Australian rules footballer who played with Carlton in the Victorian Football League (VFL).

Notes

External links 
		
Frank Triplett's profile at Blueseum

1885 births
1967 deaths
Carlton Football Club players
Australian rules footballers from Melbourne
People from Carlton, Victoria